Ziyuan may refer to:

Ziyuan (字苑), or Essays on Chinese Characters, Chinese dictionary attributed to the Eastern Jin Dynasty scholar Ge Hong
Ziyuan County (资源县), Guilin, Guangxi, China
Ziyuan Town (资源镇), town in and county seat of Ziyuan County
Ziyuan (satellite), a series of Chinese satellites
Ziyuan (子遠), style name of Xu You